Sumpango is a town, with a population of 28,488 (2018 census), and a municipality in the Guatemalan department of Sacatepéquez.

History

In the 1540s, bishop Francisco Marroquín split the ecclesiastical administration of the central valley of Guatemala between the Order of Preachers and the Franciscans, assigning Sumpango's curato to the former.  In 1638, the Dominicans separated their large doctrines in groups revolving around six convents:

Ecclesiastic historian Domingo Juarros wrote that in 1754, by virtue of a royal order of the enlightened absolutism of king Carlos III all curatos and doctrines of the regular clergy were moved on to the secular clergy.

Giant kite festival

Sumpango's Festival, also known as the "Giant Kite Festival" is a cultural event that takes place on the first of November each year. On that day, people from the town gather at the football field near the town's cemetery to take part in a giant kite contest. Entrants have typically spent months creating their kites, and participating kites are graded on both creativity and length of flight. This contest has been around for several centuries and is now recognized as a Cultural Good of Guatemala. It was also granted a Cultural Award by then president Óscar Berger Perdomo in the mid 2000s.

Climate

Sumpango has a subtropical highland climate (Köppen climate classification: Cwb).

See also
 
 
 List of places in Guatemala

Notes and references

References

Bibliography

External links
 
Sumpango.com.gt Official city website Update In Spanish
Official city website In Spanish

Municipalities of the Sacatepéquez Department